Jack House (21 March 1888 – 12 January 1967) was a former Australian rules footballer who played with Melbourne in the Victorian Football League (VFL).

Notes

External links 

1888 births
Australian rules footballers from Victoria (Australia)
Melbourne Football Club players
Golden Point Football Club players
1967 deaths